Barehsar (also Romanized as Barehsar Mridhan)
 is a city and capital of Khorgam District, in Rudbar County, Gilan Province, Iran.  At the 2006 census, its population was 1,508, in 446 families.

References

 Populated places in Rudbar County

 Cities in Gilan Province